Henrique Eduardo da Silva (born June 23, 1972 in Arraial do Cabo) is a former football defender from Brazil. His most common position in defense was left-back.

Career
Da Silva started his career at local club Cabofriense before playing for several Paraguayan clubs such as Cerro Corá, Sport Colombia and Cerro Porteño before moving to Argentina where he had brief stints playing for Platense in 1998 and Ferro Carril Oeste in 1999.

Da Silva came back to Paraguay in 2000 to join Club Olimpia (Olimpia Asunción), where he spent the best years of his career until 2003, winning the Paraguayan Primera División championship and two CONMEBOL international tournaments (Copa Libertadores and Recopa Sudamericana). He also played in Brazil for Atlético Mineiro.

Titles

References

External links
 Henrique da Silva at BDFA.com.ar 

1972 births
Living people
Brazilian footballers
Brazilian expatriate footballers
Associação Desportiva Cabofriense players
Cerro Porteño players
Club Atlético Platense footballers
Ferro Carril Oeste footballers
Club Olimpia footballers
Clube Atlético Mineiro players
Expatriate footballers in Argentina
Expatriate footballers in Paraguay
Association football defenders